Vion may refer to:
Vion NV, European meat processor
FC ViOn Zlaté Moravce, a football team from Zlaté Moravce in Slovakia
Vion Pharmaceuticals, Inc., a pharmaceutical company in Connecticut, USA
Michel Vion, French alpine skier
places in France:
 Vion, Ardèche, a commune in the department of Ardèche
 Vion, Sarthe, a commune in the department of Sarthe

See also
Voies, a former municipality in Greece, sometimes spelled Vion